Louisville Male Traditional High School is a public co-ed secondary school serving students in grades 9 through 12 in the southside of Louisville, Kentucky, USA. It is part of the Jefferson County Public School District.

History

Ninth and Chestnut (1856–1897)

Founded  in 1856, Louisville Male High School became one of the first high schools west of the Allegheny Mountains. Therefore, Male was known originally as "High School." In 1861, Male was designated The University of Public Schools of Louisville and awarded bachelor's degrees until 1921. After other high schools were established in the years following, the school was named Louisville Male High School. The "H" was kept as the school's letter for tradition and to honor the origins of the school.

Corner of Brook Street and Breckinridge Street (1915–1991)

In the 1970s, Male was chosen as the Traditional High School, becoming the first magnet program in the school district.
In 1976, an early-morning bomb explosion on Labor Day caused damage to the school's gymnasium; it occurred during several days of anti-busing protests in the Louisville area. The FBI was called in to investigate.

This location is now owned by the Salvation Army and is a historic landmark in Louisville.

4409 Preston Highway (1991–present)
In August 1991, Male moved to its current campus at 4409 Preston Highway, an educational facility that doubled the instructional, laboratory, library and campus space.  Since it has moved to this location, the school has won two U.S. Department of Education Blue Ribbon awards. The site was previously Sallie P. Durrett High School, which became the Durrett Education Center in the early 1980s and was used by Jefferson County Public Schools Library Media Services until 1991. The adjoining Gheens Academy, which opened in 1983, was previously Prestonia Elementary School.

Gheens Academy 
Gheens Academy opened in 1983 after having previously been Prestonia Elementary School. Gheens is a separate building from male and functions as a place for other classrooms. Classes in Gheens are generally more oriented towards elective activities and other arts. Gheens includes the Male auditorium, band room, orchestra room, cafeteria, and also a garage.

Academics

The school runs a unique curriculum that is different from the other public high schools in the city. All students participate in the College Preparatory Program so as to aid in a smooth the transition to higher education.

Students have an opportunity to graduate with a Commonwealth Diploma, which demands more than the required units for graduating high school in JCPS. One of the stipulations is the successful completion (i.e., receiving a grade of "C" or its equivalent) in 6 AP courses in the areas of English, science/mathematics, foreign language, and elective.

Athletics
On Saturday, November 18, 1893, the annual Male-Manual football rivalry, the longest running, continuously played, high school football series in Kentucky, began. Their football team is a perennial state power, and in addition to its long-running rivalry with duPont Manual High School, Male is also a close rival with St. Xavier High School, with the annual contest usually determining the fate of the district champion; however, due to the state's realignment of high school football into a six-class system starting in 2007–08, Male also has a rivalry with Trinity High School in football.
The school offers football, basketball, baseball, softball, bowling, tennis, soccer, field hockey, wrestling, swimming, track and field and lacrosse.

Venues

Maxwell Field, formerly called High School Park, was the football stadium located behind Male's former location on Brook Street. This is now the site of the Dawson Orman Education Center.

Sports championships

Notable alumni

 General James R. Allen – Commander-in-Chief of the Military Airlift Command
 Chris Barclay – professional football player
 Ralph Beard – professional basketball player
 Winston Bennett – professional basketball player
 Porter Bibb – the first publisher of Rolling Stone
 Louis Brandeis - the first Jewish  Supreme Court justice 
 Hunter S. Thompson – journalist and author of ''Fear and Loathing in Las Vegas'
 Michael Bush – professional football player
 Tony Driver – professional football player for Notre Dame and the Buffalo Bills
 Marcus Green – professional football player
 Sean Green – Major League Baseball pitcher
 Darrell Griffith – professional basketball player
 D.J. Johnson – professional football player
 Kenny Kuhn – professional baseball player
 Chris Redman – professional football player
 Warren Oates - film actor

See also
 Public schools in Louisville, Kentucky

References

External links

Max Preps – Louisville Male Bulldogs

Male High School
Educational institutions established in 1856
1856 establishments in Kentucky
Local landmarks in Louisville, Kentucky
National Register of Historic Places in Louisville, Kentucky
School buildings on the National Register of Historic Places in Kentucky
Public high schools in Kentucky
Magnet schools in Kentucky
High schools in Louisville, Kentucky